Siebrecht is a German surname. Notable people with the surname include:

Gloria Jean Siebrecht (born 1940), American paleontologist
Henry Augustus Siebrecht (1849–1934), German-American horticulturalist
Sebastian Siebrecht (born 1973), German chess grandmaster

German-language surnames
Surnames from given names